The Latin Carga Convair CV-880 crash happened on November 3, 1980 at the Simon Bolivar International Airport in Caracas, Venezuela.

Latin Carga was a Venezuelan cargo airline. Most of the airline's aircraft were small turbo-props. However, it obtained two used Convair CV-880 airliners, including the one that crashed in this accident and had begun its commercial airline career flying for Delta Air Lines.

A crew of four took off from Bolivar International Airport on November 3, 1980 on a training flight. Soon after take-off, the plane plummeted, causing the deaths of all 4 occupants.

References

Aviation accidents and incidents in 1980
Accidents and incidents involving the Convair 880
Aviation accidents and incidents in Venezuela
1980 in Venezuela 
1980 disasters in Venezuela 
November 1980 events in South America